Aleksandar Panajotović (born 28 January 1952) is a former Yugoslav and Serbian footballer.

Club career
After growing up in Kruševac, Panajotović moved to Pirot with his family when still a child. He initially played handball but later switched to football and joined the youth team of Radnički Pirot. Shortly after, Panajotović was promoted to the first team, helping them win promotion to the Yugoslav Second League in 1969. A year later, Panajotović was transferred to Yugoslav champions Red Star Belgrade, signing a four-year contract in June 1970.

In the second half of the 1976–77 season, Panajotović moved to fellow Yugoslav First League side Radnički Niš. He was a regular member of the team that reached the semi-finals of the 1981–82 UEFA Cup, scoring three goals in the process. During the following season, Panajotović left the club and spent the final years of his career with Yumco Vranje and Napredak Aleksinac, playing in the lower leagues.

International career
Panajotović represented Yugoslavia at the 1971 Mediterranean Games, winning the gold medal. He scored four goals in the tournament. He also played for Yugoslavia during the 1974 UEFA European Under-23 Championship.

Honours
Red Star Belgrade
 Yugoslav First League: 1972–73
 Yugoslav Cup: 1970–71

References

External links
 
 

Association football defenders
Association football forwards
Competitors at the 1971 Mediterranean Games
FK Radnički Niš players
FK Radnički Pirot players
Mediterranean Games gold medalists for Yugoslavia
Mediterranean Games medalists in football
Red Star Belgrade footballers
Serbian footballers
Yugoslav First League players
Yugoslav footballers
1952 births
Living people
Sportspeople from Kruševac